Andrew Ralph Stynchula (January 7, 1939 – August 1, 1985) was an American football defensive lineman in the National Football League for the Washington Redskins, New York Giants, Baltimore Colts, and the Dallas Cowboys.  He played college football at Penn State University.

Early years
Stynchula attended Latrobe High School, before moving on to Penn State University. He played as a defensive and offensive tackle.

In 1958, he was the first recipient of the Red Worrell Award, given in Penn State to the player that shows exemplary conduct, loyalty, interest, attitude and improvement during spring practice.

Professional career

Washington Redskins
Stynchula was selected in the third round (28th overall) of the 1960 NFL Draft. He was also selected by the New York Titans in the 1960 AFL Draft. As a rookie, he was named the starter at right defensive end and received Pro Bowl honors.

On April 10, 1964, he was traded along with running back Dick James to the New York Giants in exchange for All-Pro linebacker Sam Huff and a fifth round draft choice (#62-Frank Lambert).

New York Giants
In 1964, he was moved to left defensive tackle. The next year, he was switched to right defensive end and played out his contract option, so he could become a free agent in 1966. On February 16, 1966, to avoid losing him without receiving any compensation, he was traded to the Baltimore Colts in exchange for safety Wendell Harris.

Baltimore Colts
In 1966, he was placed on the injured reserve list after the eighth game of the season. He was released on September 10, 1968.

Dallas Cowboys
On October 31, 1968, he was signed by the Dallas Cowboys to the taxi squad. On November 9, he was promoted to the active roster and played in 5 games as a reserve. On July 13, 1969, he announced his retirement.

Personal life
On Thursday, August 1, 1985, he died in a car accident on the northernmost island of the Berry Islands, while on vacation in the Bahamas.

References

1939 births
1985 deaths
American football defensive tackles
Players of American football from Pennsylvania
Baltimore Colts players
Dallas Cowboys players
New York Giants players
Penn State Nittany Lions football players
People from Westmoreland County, Pennsylvania
Road incident deaths in the Bahamas
Washington Redskins players